The Las Vegas Story is a 1952 American suspense film noir starring Jane Russell and Victor Mature, directed by Robert Stevenson and produced by Robert Sparks and Howard Hughes with Samuel Bischoff as the executive producer.

The story linking the scenes is narrated by Hoagy Carmichael.

Plot
Happy (Hoagy Carmichael), is the piano player at the "Last Chance Casino" in Las Vegas. He wonders what split up Linda Rollins (Jane Russell) and Dave Andrews (Victor Mature). He ruminates that "something quick and sudden must have happened to them".

Linda reluctantly returns to Las Vegas by train when her loser husband Lloyd Rollins (Vincent Price) insists on vacationing there. When the couple disembarks, fellow passenger Tom Hubler (Brad Dexter) hurriedly does as well. Upon checking into The Fabulous Hotel & Casino, Rollins requests a line of credit and Linda discovers that her husband is in some kind of financial trouble, possibly criminal as well, and suspects he is trying to raise money by gambling. The first night, Rollins insists she wears her necklace, appraised at $150,000, when they go out.

Later, Linda encounters Dave, now a lieutenant with the Sheriff's Department, who is initially none too pleased to see her again.  They heatedly discuss what it had been that ended their relationship.

The next day, Hubler tries to become friendly with Linda at the hotel pool, but she brushes him off. He later informs Lloyd that he has been assigned by his insurance company to watch him and the necklace. Later, Mr. Drucker, The Fabulous' Managing Director, discovers Rollins is a fraud and confronts him and tells him he is no longer welcome at The Fabulous.

Rollins then obtains $10,000 credit with Clayton, owner of the appropriately named Last Chance casino, by putting up Linda's necklace, but inevitably loses it all gambling. He tries to get Clayton to advance him more credit, but Clayton turns him down, telling him he will sell him the necklace back for the $10,000. Early the next morning, Clayton is found stabbed to death, and the necklace is missing. Dave assumes the murderer took the necklace.

Dave arrests Rollins. Rollins tries to get his wife to provide him an alibi but she cannot, as she was with Dave at his home at the time, the two have reconnected.

For unknown reasons, with a suspect in custody, Hubler returns to the scene of the crime with Linda and has her reenact her steps the night before, thereby implicating himself. Dave, figures out the real killer's identity when Happy tells Dave of Hubler's actions with Linda and Dave realizes Hubler slipped up and revealed the actual location of the stabbing. After the murderer left, the dying Clayton had managed to crawl toward a telephone and Hubler didn't know that.

Dave phones Linda to warn her, but Hubler, who has been after the necklace for himself the whole time, deduces the situation and, again, for unknown reasons, kidnaps Linda. With roadblocks set up on all major highways and a description of his rented car, he steals another car, killing the owner. Dave engages a helicopter and spots the speeding vehicle. He and the pilot manage to force Hubler to leave the car at an abandoned base. Hubler wounds the pilot and forces Dave to throw out his gun by threatening to kill Linda but, after a chase and a fight, Dave is able to retrieve a gun and shoot Hubler dead.

Back in Las Vegas, Linda decides to break up with her husband and remain in Las Vegas. Lloyd, who has been released from the murder charge, is quickly re-arrested on embezzlement and other charges.

The film ends with the main surviving characters standing at the piano with Happy singing "My Resistance Is Low".

Cast
 Jane Russell as Linda Rollins
 Victor Mature as Dave Andrews
 Vincent Price as Lloyd Rollins
 Hoagy Carmichael as Happy
 Brad Dexter as Tom Hubler
 Gordon Oliver as Mr. Drucker
 Jay C. Flippen as Captain H. A. Harris, Dave's boss
 Will Wright as Mike Fogarty
 Bill Welsh as Mr. Martin
 Ray Montgomery as Desk Clerk
 Colleen Miller as Mary
 Robert J. Wilke as Clayton
 Paul Frees as the District Attorney (uncredited)

Production
The movie was originally called The Miami Story. It was from a story by Jay Dratner and was supposed to star Robert Ryan. However then it was changed to a vehicle for Victor Mature and Jane Russell, with Sam Bischoff to produce.

Filming was to have started in December 1950 but the start date was pushed back to March 1951, by which time the title had been changed to The Las Vegas Story.

Filming took place at RKO and on location in Las Vegas (also, the Mojave Airport). Filming finished by June.

Jarrico Lawsuit
Howard Hughes ordered that the credit of writer Paul Jarrico be removed because of his communist affiliations. Jarrico took this to court but lost because it was held he had voided his morals clause. This opened the floodgates for producers to employ blacklisted writers during the McCarthy Era without having to credit them.

Reception

Box-office
The film lost an estimated $600,000.

Critical response
Bosley Crowther, the film critic for The New York Times, gave the film a mixed review, writing, "The Las Vegas Story at the Paramount is one of those jukebox gambling films that gives the impression of being made up as it goes along ... For the simple fact is that Miss Russell is slightly grotesque to look upon in the tacky costumes and pinched-in get-ups with which she is cheaply adorned, and for the rest she contributes to the drama nothing more than a petulant pout and a twangy whine. But, then, the scriptwriters, Earl Felton and Harry Essex, have not made demands in their loose-jointed, tabloid-tinted fiction for more than the lady gives. And the rest of the cast does not embarrass her by playing above her head. The best to be said on behalf of this hit-or-miss R. K. O. film is that, in throwing side glances at the sap-traps of Las Vegas, it points its own indeterminate moral: patrons proceed at their own risk; the odds are in favor of the house."

In their film review, Time Out magazine discussed the background of the studio that produced the film, writing, "A minor RKO gem showing all the preferences of its then owner Howard Hughes (aeroplanes, brunettes, breasts and disenchanted heroes)...It all finishes with a perfunctory nod toward family values (by marrying off an irrelevant young couple), but the film wears its intentions on its sleeve with the final shot: Hoagy looks first at the seductive Russell, then winks at us as he sings, My Resistance Is Low".

Film critic Dennis Schwartz liked the film and wrote, "Robert Stevenson (My Forbidden Past) walks out a winner in this pulpish crime drama that he directed with panache. It's mainly scripted by Paul Jarrico who received no screen credit because of his pro-communist sympathies that met with the disapproval of nutty right-wing RKO boss Howard Hughes, who decided to take on the powerful Screen Writers Guild. This prompted a civil suit by Jarrico, who later suffered from a blacklist by HUAC over his politics. Hughes lost $600,000 on this B-film gem, probably the best film he ever produced...The exciting climax has for the first time a car/helicopter chase sequence on film ... It ends with a playful Happy and a divorce-minded Linda working together again and singing a duette with lyrics such as "Keep your distance, my resistance is low", which might explain what this appealing oddball story was all about."

RKO announced plans to reteam Mature and Russell in Split Second, but neither ended up appearing in that film.

See also
 List of films set in Las Vegas

References

External links

 
 
 
 

1952 films
1952 crime drama films
American black-and-white films
1950s English-language films
Film noir
Films based on short fiction
Films directed by Robert Stevenson
Films set in the Las Vegas Valley
Films about gambling
American crime drama films
Films produced by Howard Hughes
Films produced by Samuel Bischoff
Films scored by Leigh Harline
RKO Pictures films
1950s American films